Vasil Lobzhanidze (born 14 October 1996) is a Georgian rugby union player. His position is scrum-half, and he currently plays for Brive in the Top 14 and the Georgia national team.

Lobzhanidze was named to the Georgia squad for the 2015 Rugby World Cup, and in Georgia's opening match against Tonga became the youngest player ever to appear in a World Cup match. On 1 February 2020, aged 23 years and 110 days, he broke George North’s record to become the youngest player ever to reach 50 Test caps.

On 18 December 2015, Lobzhanidze signed his first full professional contract with top French club CA Brive in the Top 14 from the 2016-17 season.

References

1996 births
Living people
Rugby union players from Georgia (country)
Georgia international rugby union players
Rugby union scrum-halves
Expatriate rugby union players from Georgia (country)
Expatriate rugby union players in France
Expatriate sportspeople from Georgia (country) in France
Rugby union players from Tbilisi
CA Brive players